The Government Indian School, also known as the B.I.A. School and later the City Multipurpose Building, is a historic school building in Haines, Alaska. It is basically a Cape Cod style structure, an unusual form for Southeast Alaska, and an unusual sight when it was built. About 1/3 of its interior provided living quarters for the schoolmaster, and there were two classrooms on the first floor, and an auxiliary finished space in the loft area that saw several uses during the building's use as a school. The building is distinctive as a rare early school building built by the United States Bureau of Indian Affairs, and it was the first 20th century structure built in Haines. It served as a school until 1945, after which it was adapted to other public uses. The building is currently hosting the Chilkat Valley Preschool.

The building was listed on the National Register of Historic Places in 1980.

See also
National Register of Historic Places listings in Haines Borough, Alaska

References

External links
 Chilkat Valley Preschool website

School buildings completed in 1905
Bureau of Indian Education
Buildings and structures on the National Register of Historic Places in Haines Borough, Alaska
Native American history of Alaska
Native American schools
School buildings on the National Register of Historic Places in Alaska
Schools in Haines Borough, Alaska
1905 establishments in Alaska